Tricia Fabbri is an American basketball coach who is currently the women's basketball head coach at Quinnipiac University.

Fabbri grew up in Delran Township, New Jersey and graduated from Delran High School in 1987.

Playing career

Fabbri played college basketball at Fairfield University, where she set a school record in points scored in a game with 35 versus Memphis University, scored 1,622 points and grabbed 1,037 rebounds en route to being named to the All-Rookie Team in 1988–89 and to the MAAC All-Conference First Team the following three seasons. Her team won two MAAC Championships and subsequent automatic bids to the NCAA Women's Basketball Championships in 1990 and 1991. She was elected to the Fairfield University Athletic Hall of Fame in 1998 and named to the MAAC 25th Anniversary Team in 2005.

Fabbri received her bachelor's degree from Fairfield University in 1991.

Coaching career

Fabbri began her coaching career as an assistant at Fairfield from 1991 to 1995. Since taking over the helm at Quinnipiac in 1995, Fabbri has become the all-time winningest coach in Quinnipiac program history with a 379–276 (.579) overall and a 255–152 (.627) conference record. From 2012 to 2017, Fabbri has led Quinnipiac to two 30 plus win seasons, four conference regular season championships, three conference tournament championships (2016–17, 2014–15 MAAC & 2012–13 NEC), three NCAA Tournament berths (2016–17 Sweet 16), and two WNIT berths. She has been a five-time conference coach of the year (2015–16, 2014–15 MAAC & 2012–13, 2005–06, 2000–01 NEC).

Sources:

 Quinnipiac Record Book
 Northeast-10 Record Book
 Tricia Fabbri bio
 NEC Standings 1998–2012
 MAAC 2013–15 Women's Basketball Standings

Head coaching record

References

External links
Quinnipiac bio

Year of birth missing (living people)
Living people
People from Delran Township, New Jersey
Sportspeople from Burlington County, New Jersey
Basketball coaches from New Jersey
Basketball players from New Jersey
American women's basketball coaches
Delran High School alumni
Fairfield University alumni
Forwards (basketball)
Quinnipiac Bobcats women's basketball coaches
Fairfield Stags women's basketball players
Fairfield Stags women's basketball coaches